Marco Ilaimaharitra (born 26 July 1995) is a professional footballer who plays as a defensive midfielder for the Belgian First Division A club Sporting Charleroi. Born in France, he is a former member of its the under-19 and under-20 national teams but represents Madagascar at senior international level.

Club career
Born in Mulhouse, Ilaimaharitra started his career with his hometown club, AS Coteaux Mulhouse. Later, he joined FC Mulhouse. In 2008, he joined the youth team of FC Sochaux-Montbéliard. His professional debut came on 14 December 2013, in a 1–0 away defeat against OGC Nice. Four days later, he featured in the Coupe de la Ligue against OGC Nice.

International career
Ilaimaharitra was born in France, and is of Malagasy and Réunionnais descent. Previously a youth international for France, he made his debut for Madagascar in a friendly match against Comoros on 11 November 2017.

On 27 June 2019, Ilaimaharitra scored a late 76th minute free-kick against Burundi to secure a 1–0 win and historic first ever win for Madagascar in the 2019 Africa Cup of Nations.

Career statistics

Club

International

International goals
Scores and results list Madagascar's goal tally first, score column indicates score after each Ilaimaharitra goal.

Honours

Individual

National Team
Man of the Match Burundi group B (1) : Africa Cup Of Nation 2019 
Knight Order of Madagascar: 2019

References

External links

 

1995 births
Living people
Association football midfielders
People with acquired Malagasy citizenship
Malagasy footballers
Madagascar international footballers
2019 Africa Cup of Nations players
Malagasy people of Réunionnais descent
Belgian Pro League players
R. Charleroi S.C. players
Malagasy expatriate footballers
Malagasy expatriate sportspeople in Belgium
Expatriate footballers in Belgium
French footballers
Footballers from Mulhouse
France youth international footballers
French sportspeople of Malagasy descent
French people of Réunionnais descent
Ligue 1 players
Ligue 2 players
Championnat National 2 players
FC Sochaux-Montbéliard players
French expatriate footballers
French expatriate sportspeople in Belgium
Recipients of orders, decorations, and medals of Madagascar